NGC 2403 (also known as Caldwell 7) is an intermediate spiral galaxy in the constellation Camelopardalis. It is an outlying member of the M81 Group, and is approximately 8 million light-years distant. It bears a similarity to M33, being about 50,000 light years in diameter and containing numerous star-forming H II regions. 
The northern spiral arm connects it to the star forming region NGC 2404. NGC 2403 can be observed using 10×50 binoculars. NGC 2404 is 940 light-years in diameter, making it one of the largest known H II regions. This H II region represents striking similarity with NGC 604 in M33, both in size and location in galaxy.

Supernovae 
There have been two reported supernovae in the galaxy: SN 1954J, which attained a magnitude of 16 at its brightest, and SN 2004dj. SN 2004dj was the nearest and brightest supernovae in the past 17 years. It remains nearest and brightest supernova in 21st century.

History
The galaxy was discovered by William Herschel in 1788. Edwin Hubble detected Cepheid variables in NGC 2403 using the Hale telescope, making it the first galaxy beyond the Local Group within which a Cepheid was discovered. He derived a distance of 8,000 light years.

Companions
NGC 2403 has two known companions. One is the relatively massive dwarf galaxy DDO 44. It is currently being disrupted by NGC 2403, as evidenced by a tidal stream extending  on both sides of DDO 44. DDO 44 is approaching NGC 2403 at a distance much closer than typical for dwarf galaxy interactions. It currently has a V-band absolute magnitude of −12.9, but its progenitor was even more luminous.

The other known companion is officially named MADCASH J074238+652501-dw, although it is nicknamed MADCASH-1. The name refers to the MADCASH (Magellanic Analog Dwarf Companions and Stellar Halos) project. MADCASH-1 is similar to typical dwarf spheroidal galaxies in the Local Group; it is quite faint, with an absolute V-band magnitude of −7.81, and has only an ancient, metal-poor population of red giant stars.

See also
 Triangulum Galaxy-looks very similar to NGC 2403.

References

External links

Spiral Galaxy NGC 2403 at the astro-photography site of Mr. Takayuki Yoshida
NGC 2403 at ESA/Hubble

 SEDS – NGC 2403

Intermediate spiral galaxies
M81 Group
Camelopardalis (constellation)
2403
03918
21396
007b
Astronomical objects discovered in 1788
Discoveries by William Herschel